First Presbyterian Church is a historic church at 1333 3rd Street in Napa, California.

It was built in 1874 in the Neo-Gothic style and was added to the National Register of Historic Places in 1975.  The building was damaged by the 2014 South Napa earthquake. The church's congregation moved back into the sanctuary in July 2016 following repairs and restoration.

References

Presbyterian churches in California
Churches on the National Register of Historic Places in California
Carpenter Gothic church buildings in California
Churches completed in 1874
Churches in Napa County, California
National Register of Historic Places in Napa County, California